Boquerón Airport  is a private airstrip  east-southeast of the coastal town of Boquerón in the municipality of Cabo Rojo, Puerto Rico. It is located on road PR-301, and it has a single asphalt runway.

See also

Transport in Puerto Rico
List of airports in Puerto Rico

References

External links 
OpenStreetMap - Boqueron Airport

SkyVector - Boqueron Airport
Boqueron aeronautical chart

Airports in Puerto Rico
Cabo Rojo, Puerto Rico